Shohratgarh is a town and tehsil in Siddharthnagar district, Uttar Pradesh state of India.

Demographics
, the India census, the population of Shohratgarh town is 35000 and total population of this sub division is 420,532, with the sex ratio of 970 female per 1000 male. Males constitute about 52 percent of the total population and females 48 percent. The literacy rate of Shohratgarh town is about 78.08 percent, higher than the state average of 68 percent. Male literacy is 79.98 percent, and the female is 68.04 percent approx. In Shohratgarh, 15 percent of the population is under six years of age.

Transport 
Shohratgarh railway station (station code–SOT) is located on the way to Gorakhpur from Gonda and connected to Gorakhpur Lucknow, Kanpur, Mumbai and New Delhi.  The national highways - 730 are connected to this town from Kushinagar Gorakhpur and Balrampur  sravasti pilibhit as the part of India-Japan Buddhist circuit project for the roadways facility of indian government.

References

External links
 Village Population of Shohratgarh sub division

Cities and towns in Siddharthnagar district